International University of East Africa (IUEA) is a private for non-profit institution in Uganda, is a chartered University by the Uganda National Council for Higher Education (NCHE).

In September 2022 the International University of East Africa has been approved for grant of a charter by the National Council for Higher Education (NCHE).

A Charter is the highest license an institution of higher learning can attain from the regulators. And the charter can be granted only by the Head of State on the evidence that the university meets the requirements and standards of academic excellence set by the Uganda National Council for Higher Education and the Ministry of Education.

Furthermore, according to section 103(a) of the Universities and other Tertiary Institutions Act of 2001 as amended; a chartered university means a university that is comparable to a public university.

Uganda has more than 60 universities, of which about eight are public universities financed by the government, and about 52 are private universities and other tertiary degree awarding institutions. Of the private universities, only a handful, IUEA among them, have been chartered.

For any private university, getting a charter means that the institution has sufficiently demonstrated its ability to provide an environment that supports and nurtures quality education. Over the years, IUEA has consistently demonstrated its academic and technological prowess.

Overview
International University of East Africa is one of the newest universities in Uganda. Located in Kansanga, off the Kampala-Ggaba Road, in the southern part of the Kampala Metropolitan Area, the campus measures . Once the campus infrastructure is fully installed, the student body is expected to swell to 10,000. The first Chancellor of IUEA is Professor Emmanuel Tumusiime-Mutebile, the late Governor of the Bank of Uganda, the national Central Bank of Uganda. The current Vice Chancellor is Dr. Emeka Akaezuewa.

Location
IUEA has its main campus on a  piece of property at Kansanga, a south-eastern suburb of Kampala, Uganda's capital and largest city. The coordinates of the university campus are:0°17'05.0"N, 32°36'24.0"E (Latitude:0.284722; Longitude:32.606667).

History
The university was founded in 2010 and began admitting students in July 2011.  IUEA is licensed by the Uganda National Council of Higher Education (UNCHE), the government body that licenses institutions of higher learning in the country. The first batch of IUEA students graduated in 2014, numbering just 264.

Faculties
, IUEA has the following faculties:
 Faculty of Business and Management
 Faculty of Engineering
 Faculty of Science and Technology
 Faculty of Law
Besides the faculties mentioned above IUEA also has a Foundation Studies Department that offers Higher Education Certificate programmes in Arts or Sciences. It also has a Centre of Languages and Professional Skills (CLAPS) that offers language and other short courses.

Courses

Postgraduate Courses 
 Masters of Business Administration
 Masters of information Technology

Undergraduate Degree Courses 
 Bachelor of Law
 Bachelor of Business Administration
 Bachelor of Public Administration
 Bachelor of Human Resource Management
 Bachelor of Procurement and Logistics Management
 Bachelor of Tourism & Hospitality Service Management
 Bachelor of Information Technology
 Bachelor of Science in Computer Science
 Bachelor of Science in Environmental Science & Management
 Bachelor of Science in Software Engineering
 Bachelor of Science in Electrical Engineering
 Bachelor of Science in Civil Engineering
 Bachelor of Science in Petroleum Engineering
 Bachelor of Science in Mobile & Satellite Communication
 Bachelor of Architecture

Diploma Courses 
 Diploma in Public Administration
 Diploma in Business Administration
 Diploma in Computer Science
 Diploma in Electrical Engineering
 Diploma in Civil Engineering
 Diploma in Architecture

Foundation Programme 

 Higher Education Certificate in Arts
 Higher Education Certificate in Science

Centre for Languages & Professional Skills 

 Certificate in English (Beginner/Elementary/Intermediate)

Public figures

Former teachers

 Olubayi Olubayi : Scientist, writer and former vice-chancellor
 Emmanuel Tumusiime-Mutebile : Ugandan economist and banker, chancellor

Notable alumni

 Canary Mugume: Ugandan investigative journalist
 Amini Cishugi: Congolese YouTuber and writer
 Bobi Wine: Ugandan musician and politician
 Pia Pounds: Musician

See also
 KCCA
 Makindye Division
 Uganda Education
 Uganda Universities
 UG University Leaders

References

External links
 Official website
   University Gives Ugandans 40% Discount On Fees

 
Educational institutions established in 2011
Education in Kampala
2011 establishments in Uganda